Renate Sommer (born 10 September 1958) is a German politician who served as a Member of the European Parliament (MEP) from 1999 until 2019. She is a member of the Christian Democratic Union, part of the European People's Party.

Member of the European Parliament
Between 1999 and 2009, Sommer served on the Committee on Transport and Tourism. From 2009 to 2014, she was a member of the Committee on Civil Liberties, Justice and Home Affairs. Since 2014, she has been a member of the Committee on the Environment, Public Health and Food Safety.

Since 2014, Sommer has been the president of the European Parliament Beer Club. In 2010 she was the rapporteur of the directive on food labelling  and she opposes any EU-wide approach to alcohol regulation, citing cultural differences across countries.

In 2019, during the debate of the new General Food Law Regulation which followed the controversial reauthorisation of glyphosate, she opposed an increased transparency for the European Food Safety Authority, but the plenary of the European Parliament in December 2018 rejected her proposals and she resigned from her position as rapporteur. The regulation was eventually passed in April 2019 without her proposals.

Other activities
 European Parliament Beer Club, President
 Max Planck Institute for Plant Breeding Research, Member of the Board of Trustees

References

1958 births
Living people
Christian Democratic Union of Germany MEPs
MEPs for Germany 2014–2019
MEPs for Germany 2009–2014
MEPs for Germany 2004–2009
MEPs for Germany 1999–2004
20th-century women MEPs for Germany
21st-century women MEPs for Germany
Recipients of the Cross of the Order of Merit of the Federal Republic of Germany